The George V. Voinovich Bridges are two bridges in Cleveland, Ohio, U.S., that carry Interstate 90 (I-90, Innerbelt Freeway) over the Cuyahoga River. They are named for George Voinovich, former mayor of Cleveland, Governor of Ohio, and United States Senator.

The bridges'  piles are the largest ever manufactured in the United States. Combined the bridges cost $566 million.

Predecessor
The bridges were conceived as part of the Innerbelt Freeway rebuild to replace the 1959 Innerbelt Bridge, and the schedule of the project to build them was accelerated due to the deteriorating condition of the Innerbelt Bridge.

Westbound bridge
The westbound bridge was built immediately to the north of the Innerbelt Bridge. Construction on this bridge began on March 30, 2011, with a ceremonial groundbreaking following on May 2. It opened to Ontario Street ramp traffic on November 9, 2013, had opened to other ramp traffic and I-90 westbound mainline traffic by November 17, and opened to eastbound traffic, which used the westbound bridge until the completion of the eastbound bridge, on November 23. The bridge was dedicated to George Voinovich during the ribbon-cutting ceremony on November 8, 2013.

Eastbound bridge
The eastbound bridge was built in the former location of the Innerbelt Bridge. Early in the project, the proposed date of completion varied widely. Construction on the bridge had begun by November 3, 2014; the bridge opened in limited capacity the evening of September 24, 2016 after a ribbon-cutting ceremony earlier in the day, opening in full on October 24. This bridge was named for George Voinovich prior to the naming of the westbound bridge.

See also
 
 
 
 
 List of crossings of the Cuyahoga River

References

External links

Bridges completed in 2013
Voinovich
Interstate 90
Bridges over the Cuyahoga River
Road bridges in Ohio
Bridges on the Interstate Highway System
Steel bridges in the United States
Concrete bridges in the United States